Gilbert Meyer (26 December 1941 – 21 September 2020) was a French politician who served as a deputy in the National Assembly from 1993 to 2007, and Mayor of Colmar from 1995 to 4 July 2020.

Biography
Meyer was born on 26 December 1941 in Dessenheim.
From 1993 to 2007, Meyer was a member of the National Assembly for Rally for the Republic. On 1995, he became Mayor of Colmar.

In May 2020, Meyer who had been diagnosed with cancer, suffered a stroke. On 4 July 2020, Éric Straumann was appointed to succeed him as mayor. He died on 21 September 2020 aged 78.

References

1940s births
2020 deaths
Mayors of places in Grand Est
People from Haut-Rhin